Remember the Night Parties is the third album by Oxford Collapse and their first to be released by Sub Pop.

Track listing
 "He'll Paint While We Play" - 3:21
 "Please Visit Your National Parks" - 4:08
 "Loser City" - 3:54
 "For the Khakis and the Sweatshirts" - 3:12
 "Return/Of Burno" - 8:06
 "Lady Lawyers" - 3:14
 "Let's Vanish" - 3:18
 "Kenny Can't Afford It" - 2:40
 "Molasses" - 2:57
 "Forgot to Write" - 3:01
 "In Your Volcano" - 3:02

References 

Oxford Collapse albums
2006 albums
Sub Pop albums